The Robertson House is a historic house at 2nd and Dandridge Streets in Kensett, Arkansas.  It is a -story wood-frame structure, with a dormered hip roof, and a single-story porch wrapping around two sides.  The porch is supported by turned posts and sports decorative brackets.  Built about 1910, it is one of a number of surviving double-pile houses in White County, a style once built in the area in large numbers.

The house was listed on the National Register of Historic Places in 1991.

See also
National Register of Historic Places listings in White County, Arkansas

References

Houses on the National Register of Historic Places in Arkansas
Houses completed in 1910
Houses in White County, Arkansas
National Register of Historic Places in White County, Arkansas
1910 establishments in Arkansas